Hydrelia scotozona is a moth in the family Geometridae first described by Yazaki in 1995. It is found in Nepal.

References

Moths described in 1995
Asthenini
Moths of Asia